The Bahinemo languages are a small family of closely related languages of northern Papua New Guinea. The languages are:

 Bitara (Berinomo), Bahinemo (Gahom), Nigilu, Wagu
 Mari, Bisis, Kapriman (Sare) – Watakataui, Sumariup.

They are classified among the Sepik Hill languages of the Sepik family.

References

 

 
Sepik Hill languages